Mridula Sinha (27 November 1942 – 18 November 2020) was an Indian writer and politician who served as Governor of Goa from August 2014 to October 2019. She was the first woman Governor of Goa.

Mridula Sinha was also a former president of BJP Mahila Morcha. She was awarded India's fourth highest civilian award the Padma Shri posthumously in 2021.

Early life
Mridula Sinha was born on 27 November 1942,one kayasth family 
Birth, in the village Chhapra Dharampur Yadu in Muzaffarpur district in Mithila region of Bihar state in India. Her father was Babu Chhabile Singh and her mother was Anupa Devi. She attended the local school in Chhapra and later studied at Balika Vidyapeeth, a residential school for girls in Lakhisarai district.

Shortly before she completed her bachelor's degree, Mridula's parents arranged for her to marry Ram Kripal Sinha, who at that time was a college lecturer based in Muzaffarpur town, Bihar. After marriage, Mridula continued her studies and took a post-graduate degree in Psychology. She then took a job as a lecturer in the Dr. S.K. Sinha Women's College in Motihari. Shortly afterwards, her husband received his doctorate degree. She left the job and started a school in Muzaffarpur where her husband was working in a college.

Career
Meanwhile, with encouragement from her husband, Mridula experimented with the short story format. She was interested in cultural matters and village traditions. She wrote short stories on these topics and on folk tales that she gathered from the villages where she and her husband worked. Many of these stories were published in Hindi language magazines and were later compiled into a two-volume anthology named Bihar ki lok-kathayen ("folk-tales of Bihar"). She also wrote several novels and a biography of Rajmata Vijayaraje Scindia titled Ek Thi Rani Aisi Bhi.  A film of the same name was later made based on this book.

Mridula initially helped her husband in reaching out to the women of the constituency during his campaigns for election to the district committee. She found that with her knowledge of local tradition and cultural nuances, she had a strong connect with the people, especially women. She developed a very strong interest and commitment for social welfare, although she had no interest in electoral politics and never contested any election. She was named Chairperson of Central Social Welfare Board.

Political career

At this time, her husband was a cabinet minister in the Bihar state government. She was, until August 2014, a member of the national executive of Bharatiya Janata Party. During the BJP's campaign for 2014 general elections, she was in charge of the BJP Mahila Morcha (women's wing). On 25 August 2014, she was appointed the Governor of Goa.

Sinha was also appointed an ambassador for the Swachh Bharat Abhiyan, by the Prime Minister of India Narendra Modi. During her tenure as Governor of Goa, she also adopted a cow and a calf at the Raj Bhavan for the purpose of daily worship.

Literary contribution
Source(s):

Ek thi rani aisi bhi (Short biography)
 Nayi devyani (Novel)
 Gharwaas (Novel)
 Jyon mehandi ko rang (Novel)
 Dekhan mein choten lagen (Stories)
 Sita puni boli (Novel)
 Yayavari ankhon se (Interviews)
 Bihar ki lok kathayen -I (Stories)
 Bihar ki lok kathayen-II (Stories)
 Dhai beegha zameen (Stories)
 Matr deh nahin hai aurat (Women liberation)
 Nari na kathputli na udanpari (2014) by Yash Publications, New Delhi
 Apna jivan (2014) by Yash Publications, New Delhi
 Antim ichha (2014) by Yash Publications, New Delhi
 Paritapt Lankeshwari (2015)
 Mujhe Kuch Kehna Hain (2015, Poetry) By Yash Publications, New Delhi
 Aaurat aaviksit purush nahi hain (2015) by Yash Publications, New Delhi
 chinta aur chintan ke inderdhanushyain rang by Mridula Sinha (2016) by Yash Publications, New Delhi
 India women new images on ancient foundation (2016) By Yash Publications, New Delhi
 ya nari sarvbuteshu (2016) By Yash Publications, New Delhi
 Relfications (2017) By Yash Publications, New Delhi
 Ek Sahitya Tirth Sw lauthkar (2017) By Yash Publications, New Delhi

Films & TV adaptation : Mridula Sinha's work like Jyon Mehendi Ko Rang, a novel is adapted into a T.V. Serial and short Story l "Dattak Pita" and autobiography on Vijayaraje Scindia Rajpath se lok path par are made into feature films as Dattak and Ek thi Rani Aisi Bhi respectively. All her major literary works adapted in films and TV are by National awards winner film maker Gul Bahar Singh.

Translations into English
 Flames of Desire

Translations into Marathi
 Anutapt Lankeshwari, a translation by Rajashree Khandeparkar

Honours
 Sinha received an honorary doctorate by the Babasaheb Bhimrao Ambedkar Bihar University in Muzaffarpur, Bihar.
 She was conferred with Acharya Tulsi Kartritva Puraskar in 2017 by Akhil Bhartiya Terapanth Mahila Mandal.

See also
 List of Indian writers

References

|-

1942 births
2020 deaths
Governors of Goa
Recipients of the Padma Shri in literature & education
Hindi-language writers
Bharatiya Janata Party politicians from Bihar
Women in Bihar politics
Women state governors of India
20th-century Indian women writers
20th-century Indian women politicians
20th-century Indian politicians
People from Muzaffarpur district
Women writers from Bihar
21st-century Indian women politicians
21st-century Indian politicians
21st-century Indian novelists
20th-century Indian novelists
21st-century Indian short story writers
20th-century Indian short story writers
Indian women poets
21st-century Indian poets
Indian women novelists
Indian women short story writers
Poets from Bihar
Novelists from Bihar
21st-century Indian women writers
21st-century Indian writers
Babasaheb Bhimrao Ambedkar Bihar University alumni
Deaths from the COVID-19 pandemic in India